The Love Hunger is a 1919 American silent comedy film directed by William P.S. Earle and starring Lillian Walker, Lee Shumway and Herbert Prior.

Cast
 Lillian Walker as Fran
 Lee Shumway as Abbott Ashton 
 Herbert Prior as 	Hamilton Gregory
 Allene Hale as Grace Noir
 Lydia Knott as Mrs. Gregory
 Andrew Arbuckle as Bob Clinton
 Billy Bletcher as Jakey	
 Cora Drew as Mrs. Jefferson

References

Bibliography
 Goble, Alan. The Complete Index to Literary Sources in Film. Walter de Gruyter, 1999.

External links
 

1919 films
1919 comedy films
1920s English-language films
American silent feature films
Silent American comedy films
American black-and-white films
Films directed by William P. S. Earle
Films distributed by W. W. Hodkinson Corporation
1910s American films